John Hilliard may refer to:

 John Hilliard (American football) (born 1976), American football player
 John Hilliard (artist) (born 1945), London-based conceptual artist, photographer and academic
 John Kenneth Hilliard (1901–1989), American acoustical engineer and loudspeaker designer
 John S. Hilliard (born 1947), American composer
 John Northern Hilliard (1872–1935), author of a best-selling book on magic, Greater Magic